Bilaspur is a district of Himachal Pradesh, India. Its capital is in the town of Bilaspur. The district has an area of 1,167 km2, and a population of 381,956. As of 2011 it is the third least populous district of Himachal Pradesh (out of 12), after Lahul and Spiti and Kinnaur.

The district has the famous Govind Sagar Lake on the Sutlej River which acts as the reservoir for the Bhakra and Nangal Dam project.

History

 
The area that is now Bilaspur District was formerly known as Kahlur, a princely state of British India. The ruler acceded to the Government of India on 12 October 1948, and Bilaspur was made an Indian state under a chief commissioner. The state of Bilaspur was merged with Himachal Pradesh on 1 July 1954 and became Bilaspur District.

Bilaspur was the capital of a state founded in the 7th century, and known as Kahlur after its earlier capital, or as Bilaspur after its later capital. The ruling dynasty was Chandela Rajputs, who claimed descent from the rulers of Chanderi in present-day Madhya Pradesh. The town of Bilaspur was founded in 1663. The state later became a princely state of British India, and was under the authority of the British province of Punjab.

On 13 May 1665, Guru Tegh Bahadur went to Bilaspur to attend the mourning for Rajput Chandel King Raja Dip Chand of Bilaspur. There Rani Champa of Bilaspur gave the Guru a piece of land in her state. The land consisted of the villages of Lodhipur, Mianpur and Sahota. Here on the mound of Makhowal, Guru Tegh Bahadur raised a new habitation. The ground was broken on 19 June 1665, by Baba Gurditta Randhawa. The new village was named after the Guru's mother, Nanaki. Chakk Nanaki later became famous as Anandpur Sahib.

In 1932 state was made part of the newly created Punjab States Agency, and in 1936 the Punjab Hill States Agency was separated from the Punjab States Agency. India became independent in 1947, and on 12 October 1948 the ruler, HH Raja Sir Anand Chandel, the last ruler of the Princely estate of Bilaspur acceded to the Government of India. Bilaspur became a separate state of India under a chief commissioner, and on 1 July 1954 Bilaspur state was made a district of Himachal Pradesh state by an act of the Indian Parliament. The historic town was submerged in 1954 when the Sutlej River was dammed to create the Govind Sagar, and a new town was built upslope of the old.

Most of the Rajputs in Bilaspur are Chandels, that is they belong to different branches of the ruling family. These families are numerous, and all enjoyed jagir pensions from state amounting in aggregate to Rs. 40,000 a year in 1933. They are called 'the Mian families', and the chief names are:
Ajmerchandia, 
Kaliyanchandia,
Tarahandia and
Sultanchandia.

Geography
Bilaspur has a hilly terrain. The district lies mostly in the Shivalik range of the Himalayas. It is surrounded by hills on all sides. To the south and west, it is bordered by Punjab. 

Summers are hot and winters are cold, with fog along banks of the river Satluj. The rainy season lasts from early July to mid-September. May and June are the hottest months and Winter season lasts from November to February.

Demographics

According to the 2011 census Bilaspur district, Himachal Pradesh has a population of 381,956, roughly equal to the nation of Maldives. This gives it a ranking of 562 in India (out of a total of 640). Its population growth rate over the decade 2001-2011 was 12.08%. Bilaspur has a sex ratio of 981 females for every 1000 males, and a literacy rate of 85.67%. 6.58% of the population lives in urban areas. Scheduled Castes and Scheduled Tribes make up 25.92% and 2.80% of the population respectively.

At the 2011 Census, 76.37% of the population spoke Bilaspuri, 8.56% Pahari, 5.80% Hindi, 4.00% Punjabi, 1.25% Kangri and 0.96% Mandeali as their first language.

Politics 

 

|}

Forts
Kahlur Fort, (Few kilometers from Ganguwal Hydro Electric Station, in Naina Devi Hill). Raja Bir Chand, an ancestor of Raja Kahal Chand, built a palace-cum-fort called Kot Kahlur. It is in ruins now. The fort is a square structure built of stones, each side is about thirty meters long and high. Its walls are about two metres thick. It has two storeys. About twelve meters above the floor of the second storey there were certain window shaped places with small peeping holes for the garrison to look-out and, if need be, shoot at attackers. Most of these hollows have now been closed with cement or iron-mesh. The upper storey is a small temple to Naina Devi with a stone idol. There are seven small ancient fortresses in the district at Bacchretu, Bahadurpur, Basseh, Fatehpur, Sariyun, Swarghat and Tiun.
Fort of Bahadurpur, (On the top of Bahadurpur hill, the highest point (1,980 m) in the district, near Tepra Village in Paragana Bahadurpur Tehsil Sadar, about 40 km from Bilaspur, Himachal Pradesh). The fort is said to have been built by Raja Keshab Chand (c A.D. 1620). It is 6 km above Namhol. From this high place the Ratanpur Fort, Swarghat, the Fatehpur Fort, the Naina Devi hill, plains near Ropar and the mountains of Shimla can be seen. The fort is now in ruins.
Fort of Sariun, (To the eastern side of the Tiun range, on the lifty range and peak of Sariun, at an elevation of about 1,500 m, about 58 km from Bilaspur, Himachal Pradesh). It appears to be rectangular structure made of stones. Its main gate faces west. From the relics it can be said that the fort was about twelve meters high. The thickness of the walls is about one metre. Within its walls a part of the area is marked by the ruins of what might be once the living rooms numbering about fifteen. The walls of the fort contain places shaped like a window with certain holes across the wall to facilitate showering of lead upon the besiegers. The fort is now in ruins
Fort of Tiun, (On the top of a hill known as the Tiun range, 17 km in length, at distance of about 45 km from Bilaspur, Himachal Pradesh, on the Ali Khad crossing Ghumarwin-Ladraur motorable road, about 10 km from Ghumarwin proper). Raja Kahn Chand got it constructed in 1142 Vikrami. The area of the fort is around 14 hectares. It is rectangle in shape. The length of the fort was 400 meters with a breadth 200 meters. The height of the wall is varies from 2 to 10 meters. The main gate of the fort is 3 meters height and 5 and a 1/2 meters breadth. There were two water tanks inside the fort. Also there were two granary which contains 3000 kg grain. The fort is said to have once served as a prison to an uncle of Raja Kharak Chand.
Fort of Bachhretu, (In Kot Hill, on the western slope of Kotdhar just 3 km southward to Shahtalai, it is 3000 ft above sea level). Magnificent and sweeping view of Gobind Sagar and the surrounding hills. The fort was constructed by Raja Ratan Chand of Bilaspur who ruled from 1355 to 1406. Obviously the relics are as old as about six hundred years and indicate that the stronghold was of a rectangular shape, the longer arms about 100 metres and shorter about 50 meters, built of hammer-dressed stones. From the portions of the enclosing walls, still existing here and there, it can be assumed to have been about 20 meters in height. The thickness of its walls must have been one metre tapering towards the top. The space inside was, perhaps, divided into numerous room-shaped compartments out of which about fifteen can be traced even now. Walls of one of the room are exceedingly high, measuring about ten to twelve metres. A water tank is also said to have existed. A very interesting small temple, housing two busts of the goddess Ashta Bhuja (eight armed) and some other deities is still extant. A pipal tree has now grown within the fort.

Thakurdwara of Sunhani, (On the bank of Seer Khad, just 3 km behind Barthin, on Bhager- Barthi & Ghumarwin road, just 8 km from Ghumarwin). Shunhani is very attractive and historical place. Raja Vikram Chand (1555-1593 AD) made Sunhani its capital this area got the credit of being Kehloor's capital for more than 100 years. Chandel kings have a tradition that where ever they went & settled, they constructed temple of Nahar Singh Ji (Nar Singh Devta) and worshiped the deity. According to this tradition they made Thakurdwara of Sunhani where they made Narsingh Devta (there Istdev) temple. On the doors of thakurdwara, there is Gupta period architecture & drawing. There are many jharokhas on the backside of Thakurdwara where sculptures of various gods and goddesses are made. Today also, people of this area offer new harvest as Nasrawan. Buffalo milk ghee is firstly offered here newly married couple move around Ficus (Pipple) tree. Shitla Mata's temple is present near it.
Thakurdwara of Auhar, (In the middle of the district Bilaspur). It was an important town of the princely state Bilaspur. Due to its importance Rani Naggar Dei built the Thakurdwara of Auhar. She also constructed on water tank with roof known as chhatwain and an inn for the stay of the travelers. In the Thakurdwara idols of 'Shaligram' and 'Narsingha' were installed. The walls of the temple have several mural paintings. The Language and Culture department has given financial assistance for the repair of the Thakurdwara.  edit
Bhakra Dam, (In Naina Devi Sub-Tehsil about 14 km from Nangal town). The highest straight gravity dam in the world occupies the predominant position amongst the places of tourist interest. The idea for the construction of this dam was conceived by Sir Louis Dane the then Lieutenant Governor of Punjab, who travelled from Sunni to Bilaspur and then onward to Ropar. The project could not make headway due to prohibitive cost of construction. In the year 1938-39 the districts of Rohtak and Hissar of the then Punjab State experienced severe drought resulting in great loss of human life and cattle. The scheme was again mooted out but was not executed due to second world war. It was only after independence in March, 1948 that the work was taken in hand for execution. On the historic day of 17 November 1955 later Prime Minister Shri Jawahar Lal Nehru placed the first bucket of concrete at the foundation.  The construction of dam was completed in October, 1962. The height of the dam is 226 metres, length at the top is 518 metres and width 9 metres. It has a length of 99 metres at the bottom and width 402 metres. The project derives its name from two villages Bhakhra and Nangal situated on the foothills of the low Himalayan ranges.
Gobind Sagar Lake, (On river Sutlej). Has been created by the huge hydel dam at Bhakra and is named in honour of Gobind Singh the Tenth Sikh guru. One of the world's highest gravity dams, the Bhakra rises 225.5 m above its lowest foundations. Under the supervision of the American dam-builder, Harvey Slocum, work began in 1955 and was completed in 1962. Incidentally, Slocum had no formal training as an engineer, but his conceptions and designs have proven successful. To maintain the level of water, the flow of river Beas was also channeled to Gobind Sagar by the Beas-Sutlej link which was completed in 1976. Today, this dam feeds electricity and water to a large area the Gobind Sagar reservoir is 90 km long and encompasses an area of approximately 170 km2. There are provisions for water sports speed boats and ferry rides. Water-skiing, sailing, kayaking and water scooter racing are water sports activities during this period.
New Bilaspur Town. The old Bilaspur town, has now been submerged in the Gobind Sagar, was founded in year 1663 when the capital of the state was shifted from Sunhani to this place, it was situated on the south east side of the Satluj. New Bilaspur Town is situated just above the old town of Bilaspur at a height of 670 metres above the mean sea level. The New Township Bilaspur has been conceived, planned and built on modern lines and should be regarded as the first planned hill town of the country. The new planned township, 64 km from Kiratpur on the Manali National Highway No. 21, has come up which is the seat of district headquarters. The Nalwari or Annual cattle fair is held at Bilaspur for four or five days in March months, the occasion is marked by wrestling and other amusements. Cattle are brought from Nalagarh and neighboring parts of Punjab sell over here. There are many temples of Sri Naina Devi Ji, Raghu Nath Ji, Gopal Ji, Khan Mukheshwar and Deomati where fairs are held.
Kandrour Bridge, (8 kilometres from Bilaspur on National Highway No. 88) Construction for this bridge across the Satluj river was started in April, 1959 and was completed in 1965. The total cost of construction was ₹28,12,998. The span of the bridge is about 280 meters with a breadth of about seven meters and the height above the lowest river bed is about 80 meters. It was once the tallest bridge of Asia. It has provided a link between Ghumarwin town of Bilaspur and Hamirpur district and is a marvellous engineering feat. The pillars supporting the bridge are hollowed. The bridge was opened by the then Minister of Transport, Shri Raj Bahadur in 1965.
Deoli Fish Farm, (15 km from New Bilaspur township towards Mandi just below the Shimla-Mandi Road). Comprising 4.4 hectares comes in existence 1962. It consists of two big brood stock tanks and 14 nursery ponds. The total outlay on setting up this hatchery was 3.68 lacks. In beginning the farms activities were limited to meet the seed stocking requirements of Gobind Sagar reservoir, but its targets were increased year to year and research, training, technique and demonstration brought under the farm programmed. During 1978 fish species being record at the farm were demonstrated to the people by constructing a small aquarium. During 1989 a training center and Hostel were constructed within the farm premises so that training course be imparted to the departmental personnel and interested fish farmers. Now training camps are being conducted with modern fish breeding and culture technique training are imparted. This farm has not only historic importance but is can be known as a center breeding excellent training in fish culture and research programmed. Keeping in view the commendable work done in the field of breeding, the Punjab University extended its recognition for undertaking research work at this farm. The Deoli fish farm has played a major role in breeding fish population in Gobind Sagar reservoir, income of the reservoir fishermen and their lives prosperous. For the first time Silver Carp fish was stocked in Gobind Sagar reservoir from Deoli farm. Every year 30-40 lacks mirror carp fingerlings are being produced at the farm and these are stocked in Gobind Sagar reservoir and other water bodies in the State and distributed to the private fish farms. Due to regular stocking in Gobind Sagar reservoir for the last decade at has a unique capacity of fish production per hectare in the country and this credit goes to Deoli farm. The scientists of ICAR and State Fisheries Department initiated a joint research project viz. 'Genetic Rejuvenation of Fish Stock in HP'. The 'Bio-Science Department' started this project entire funded about 18.00 lacks. A quality strain of fish is being reared under this project and distributed to the fish farmers. Under this technique demonstration programme a new scheme namely 'Fish Culture in Running Water' was introduced for the first time at the farm. This scheme was observed suitable especially in high altitude of Himachal Pradesh on the basis of success of this technique the Govt of India incorporated this scheme under the Centrally Sponsored Fish Farmers' Development Agency subsidy programme. The NABARD Bank has also approved this scheme namely 'Fish Culture in Running Water' which resulted in setting up of about 1000 units in the State. In recent years sport fisheries is fostering in the Gobind Sagar reservoir which clearly indicates vast potential of attracting tourists. The Deptt regularly organizes angling completions every year. In Gobind Sagar and Mahseer fish which is an important fish of this reservoir. As the breeding of Mahseer fish is not an easy job hence the Punjab University and State Fisheries Department jointly prepared a project of Rs. 19.00 lacks it was got approved from ICAR. Present hatchery set up at the Deoli farm has been constructed under this scheme. Under this scheme matured Mahseer fish would be brought from his habitat and bred in comfortable situation.
Namhol, (About 24 km from Bilaspur and 68 km from Shimla on the Bilaspur-Shimla motorable road on which regular bus service is maintained). Small hamlet. There is a Thakurdwar which was built by Raja Amar Chand in 1883 A.D. Brass idols of Ram, Lakshman, Sita and Hanuman are installed in the temple. The place is the main centre of ginger trade.

Notable individuals
Gambhari Devi, folk artist
Suresh Chandel, politician
J. P. Nadda, National president of the Bharatiya Janata Party
Suram Singh Chandel, 1st Tahsildar of Bilaspur HP
Rattan Chand, bureaucrat
Sanjay Kumar, Param Vir Chakra
Bhandari Ram, Victoria Cross
Meena Kumari, International shooter
Yami Gautam, Bollywood actress
Nina Chandel : An International Shooter and Medalist. who won the Bronze Medal in 30th World University Games 2019 held at Napoli, Italy. She os from Salnoo.
Daleep Singh Chandel is a Coach of Indian Shooting Team since 1999. Mr. Chandel belongs to Village Salnoo, Tehsil Sadar.Bilaspur.

Villages
 

Khasari
Zakatkhana

See also
Bilaspuri

References

External links
 Bilaspur District luhanu ground

 District Profile
 CULTURAL & TOURISM HERITAGE OF THE DISTRICT
 Development Data of the District

 
1954 establishments in Himachal Pradesh

sv:Bilaspur